Thomas Flynn ( – ) was a Welsh professional rugby league footballer who played in the 1920s and 1930s. He later became the groundsman at Wilderspool Stadium, Warrington.

Playing career

International honours
Flynn won a cap for Wales while at Warrington in 1931.

County honours
Tommy Flynn played  and scored a try in Monmouthshire's 14-18 defeat by Glamorgan in the non-County Championship match during the 1926–27 season at Taff Vale Park, Pontypridd on Saturday 30 April 1927.

Championship final appearances
Flynn played  in Warrington's 10–22 defeat by Wigan in the Championship Final during the 1925–26 season at Knowsley Road, St. Helens on Saturday 8 May 1926.

References

External links
Statistics at wolvesplayers.thisiswarrington.co.uk
Profile at saints.org.uk

1898 births
1974 deaths
Monmouthshire rugby league team players
Place of birth missing
Rugby league five-eighths
Rugby league halfbacks
St Helens R.F.C. players
Talywain RFC players
Wales national rugby league team players
Warrington Wolves players
Welsh rugby league players